Paint.net (stylized as Paint.NET or paint.net) is a freeware raster graphics editor program for Microsoft Windows, developed originally on .NET Framework, and as of version 4.3 .NET. Paint.net was originally created by Rick Brewster as a Washington State University student project, and has evolved from a simple replacement for the Microsoft Paint program into a program for editing mainly graphics, with support for plugins.

History
Paint.net originated as a computer science senior design project during spring 2004 at Washington State University. Version 1.0 consisted of 36,000 lines of code and was written in fifteen weeks. In contrast, version 3.35 has approximately 162,000 lines of code. The paint.net project continued over the summer and into the autumn 2004 semester for both the version 1.1 and 2.0 releases.

Development continues with one programmer who worked on previous versions of Paint.net while he was a student at WSU. As of May 2006 the program had been downloaded at least 2 million times, at a rate of about 180,000 per month.

Initially, Paint.net was released under a modified version of the MIT License, with the exclusion of the installer, text, and graphics. However, citing issues with the open source code being plagiarized by others that had rebranded the software as their own and bundled user content without their permission, the availability of the source code was restricted, in December 2007 Brewster announced his intent to restrict access to components of the program (including its installer, resources, and user interface). In November 2009, the software was made proprietary, restricting the sale or creation of derivative works of the software.

Starting with version 4.0.18, paint.net is published in two editions: A classic edition remains freeware, similar to all other versions since 3.5. Another edition, however, is published to Microsoft Store under a trialware license and is available to purchase for US$7. According to the developer, this was done to enable the users to contribute to the development with more convenience, even though the old avenue of donation was not closed.

Overview
Paint.net is primarily programmed in the C# programming language. Its native image format, .PDN, is a compressed representation of the application's internal object format, which preserves layering and other information.

Plugins
Paint.net supports plugins, which add image adjustments, effects, and support for additional file types. They can be programmed using any .NET Framework programming language, though they are most commonly written in C#. These are created by volunteer coders on the program's discussion board, the paint.net Forum. Though most are simply published via the discussion board, some have been included with a later release of the program. For instance, a DirectDraw Surface file type plugin, (originally by Dean Ashton) and an Ink Sketch and Soften Portrait effect (originally by David Issel) were added to Paint.net in version 3.10.

Hundreds of plugins have been produced; such as Shape3D, which renders a 2D drawing into a 3D shape. Some plugins expand on the functionality that comes with Paint.net, such as Curves+ and Sharpen+, which extend the included tools Curves and Sharpen, respectively.

Examples of file type plugins include an Animated Cursor and Icon plugin and an Adobe Photoshop file format plugin. Several of these plugins are based on existing open source software, such as a raw image format plugin that uses dcraw and a PNG optimization plugin that uses OptiPNG.

Forks

paint-mono
Paint.net was created for Windows, and has no native support for any other system. With its previous open-source nature, the possibility for alternate versions was available. In May 2007, Miguel de Icaza officially started a porting project called paint-mono. This project had partially ported Paint.net 3.0 to Mono, an open-source implementation of the Common Language Infrastructure on which the .NET Framework is based. This allowed Paint.net to be run on Mono-supported platforms, such as Linux. This port is no longer maintained and has not been updated since March 2009.

Newer Mono runtime 6 versions are able to run original Paint.NET releases up to 3.5.11 almost perfectly.

Pinta

In 2010, developer Jonathan Pobst started a project called Pinta, describing it as a clone of Paint.net for Mono and Gtk#. Pinta reused the adjustments and effects code from Paint.net but otherwise is original code.

Releases

See also

Image editing
Comparison of raster graphics editors
List of raster graphics editors
List of free software

References

Further reading

External links

paint.net forum
 – fork of paint.net 3.36.7
 – unofficial effort to port paint.net 3.0 to Linux using Mono

Raster graphics editors
Windows-only freeware
Technical communication tools
Graphics
Photo software
Graphics software
2004 software
C Sharp software
.NET Framework software